This is a list of the main career statistics of Russian former professional tennis player Marat Safin.

Historic records and career achievements 
At the 1998 French Open, Safin shook the tennis world by defeating defending champion Gustavo Kuerten in the second round in 5 sets, taking out the defending champion in his first Grand Slam appearance. He was named ATP Newcomer of the Year by the end of the season. The following year he reached the finals of Paris Masters on his first attempt, losing in the final to reigning world No. 1 Andre Agassi.

He set several records in 2000, including some that still stands today. In August, Safin defeated qualifier Harel Levy to win his first Masters Series title at the 2000 Canada Masters, becoming one of the few players in the Open Era to win a Masters tournament on their first attempt. In September, Safin defeated 4-time champion and 4th seed Pete Sampras in the final in straight sets to win his first Grand Slam title at the 2000 US Open. By winning the US Open at the age of 20 years and 228 days, Safin became the 3rd youngest winner in the history of the tournament at the time and the first, and to date, the only Russian to win the title in men's singles. He also became the youngest Russian to win a Grand Slam. After winning his second Masters title of the year at the Paris Masters in November, Safin became the youngest player in the Open Era at the time to reach the World No. 1 ranking at the age of 20 years and 299 days, a record since broken by Lleyton Hewitt in 2001. Safin's total number of titles (7) and finals (9) was the most on the 2000 ATP Tour, and he is also named ATP Most Improved Player.

In 2002, Safin reached his first Australian Open final, but was upset by Thomas Johansson, who has never progressed beyond the quarterfinals of a Slam prior to this tournament, in 4 sets after winning the first set. He reached the final at the Hamburg Masters for the second time in 3 years (first being in 2000). Later, he also reached his first French Open semifinal, and almost regained the No. 1 ranking (he was ranked world No. 2 for 13 weeks after the French Open). In November, he won the Paris Masters for a second time, defeating reigning world No. 1 Lleyton Hewitt in straight sets. In December, Safin lead Russia to her first Davis Cup title. The team made Davis Cup history by being the second to win the event after losing the doubles tie-breaker, and being the first team to win a (live-televised) five-set finals match by coming back from a two-set deficit. He won the ATP Fan's Favorite for the record second consecutive time after winning it in 2001, which was later broken by Roger Federer in 2005.

After a series of injuries that sidelined him for the majority of the 2003 season, Safin reached his second Australian Open final in 2004, with a win over 1st seed Andy Roddick in the quarterfinals and Andre Agassi in the semifinals, ending Agassi's 26-match win-streak at the Australian Open, however both matches has gone to five sets and Safin was physically drained for the final, as none of his matches during the tournament went under 4 sets. He was defeated by Roger Federer in straight sets, and as a result, Federer became world No. 1 for the first time in his career, and would go on to hold it for a record 237 weeks. In October, he won a Masters title in Madrid, defeating world No. 10 David Nalbandian in straight sets in the final. In November, he won the Paris Masters for a record-tying 3rd time, defeating Radek Štěpánek in straight sets in the final. The record was later broken by Novak Djokovic in 2015. Safin became the first man to win Paris Masters twice in 2 attempts. By winning the Madrid Masters and Paris Masters in the same year, Safin became the first man in Open Era to win the last two Masters title at the same year.

In 2005, Safin reached his 3rd Australian Open final in 4 years, after a memorable win over Roger Federer in the semifinals in 5 sets that lasted 4 hours and 28 minutes as a rematch of last year's final, saving a match point in the 4th set and ending Federer's 26-match win streak over Top 10 players, to set up a clash with home favorite Lleyton Hewitt. Safin prevailed in 4 sets after losing the first set to win his first Australian Open title, becoming the first man since Stefan Edberg in 1985 to win Australian Open after saving a match point, and remains the last man to do so. He became the first Russian since Yevgeny Kafelnikov in 1999 to win the Australian Open. However, injuries kept him off court for the remainder of the season since August, and he was forced to miss significant tournaments including Madrid Masters, Paris Masters (both of which he was the defending champion), US Open, and Tennis Masters Cup.

In 2006, Safin led Russia to a second Davis Cup title, after winning the decisive final rubber against José Acasuso in 4 sets. In 2007 Safin again helped Russia reach the Davis Cup final, winning a decisive rubber against Paul-Henri Mathieu in straight sets in the quarterfinals. However, Safin did not play in the final, and Russia lost 1–4 to United States. In 2008, Safin became the first Russian male to reach the Wimbledon semifinals, defeating 3rd seed Djokovic in straight sets in the second round which would follow a run of 28 consecutive quarterfinals appearances at Grand Slam tournaments and become the Serb's earliest loss at a Grand Slam event until the 2017 Australian Open. He also became the fourth of five active players at the time to reach the semifinals in all four Grand Slams, joining Federer, Nalbandian, and Djokovic, and the only Russian in the history to do so.

In 2016, Safin became the first Russian to be inducted into the International Tennis Hall of Fame.

Significant finals

Grand Slam tournaments

Singles: 4 (2 titles, 2 runners-up)

Masters Series tournaments

Singles: 8 (5 titles, 3 runners-up)

Career finals

ATP career finals

Singles: 27 (15 titles, 12 runners-up)

Doubles: 6 (2 titles, 4 runners-up)

Performance timelines 

Davis Cup matches are included in the statistics. Walkovers or qualifying matches are neither official wins nor losses.

Current as far as 2009 BNP Paribas Masters.

Singles 

Note:
At the 2003 Australian Open, Safin withdrew prior to the third round.

1 Held as Hamburg Masters (outdoor clay) until 2008, Madrid Masters (outdoor clay) 2009 – present.
2 Held as Stuttgart Masters (indoor hard) until 2001, Madrid Masters (indoor hard) from 2002 to 2008, and Shanghai Masters (outdoor hard) 2009 – present.

Doubles 

1 Held as Hamburg Masters (outdoor clay) until 2008, Madrid Masters (outdoor clay) 2009 – present.
2 Held as Stuttgart Masters (indoor hard) until 2001, Madrid Masters (indoor hard) from 2002 to 2008, and Shanghai Masters (outdoor hard) 2009 – present.

Record against other players

Singles 
Safin's record against players who held a top 10 ranking, with those who reached No. 1 in bold

 Sébastien Grosjean (7–2)
 Lleyton Hewitt (7–7)
 David Nalbandian (6–3)
 Juan Carlos Ferrero (6–6)
 Mark Philippoussis (5–1)
 Àlex Corretja (4–1)
 Nicolás Massú (4–1)
 Richard Gasquet (4–2)
 Gastón Gaudio (4–2)
 Pete Sampras (4–3)
 Jonas Björkman (4–4)
 Nikolay Davydenko (4–4)
 Tommy Robredo (4–6)
 Wayne Ferreira (3–0)
 Mikhail Youzhny (3–0)
 Jiří Novák (3–1)
 Marcelo Ríos (3–1)
 Marc Rosset (3–1)
 Rainer Schüttler (3–1)
 Paradorn Srichaphan (3–1)
 Guillermo Cañas (3–2)
 Cédric Pioline (3–2)
 Andre Agassi (3–3)
 Tim Henman (3–3)
 Thomas Johansson (3–3)
 Greg Rusedski (3–3)
 Nicolas Kiefer (3–4)
 Karol Kučera (3–4)
 Gustavo Kuerten (3–4)
 Carlos Moyá (3–4)
 Andy Roddick (3–4)
 Fernando González (3–6)
 Novak Djokovic (2–0)
 Ernests Gulbis (2–0)
 Todd Martin (2–0)
 Robin Söderling (2–0)
 Tomáš Berdych (2–1)
 Michael Chang (2–1)
 Thomas Enqvist (2–1)
 James Blake (2–2)
 Yevgeny Kafelnikov (2–2)
 Ivan Ljubičić (2–2)
 Félix Mantilla (2–2)
 Tommy Haas (2–5)
 Roger Federer (2–10)
 Mario Ančić (1–0)
 Boris Becker (1–0)
 Alberto Berasategui (1–0)
 Marin Čilić (1–0)
 Mardy Fish (1–0)
 Magnus Gustafsson (1–0)
 Petr Korda (1–0)
 Andy Murray (1–0)
 Thomas Muster (1–0)
 Fernando Verdasco (1–0)
 Marcos Baghdatis (1–1)
 Guillermo Coria (1–1)
 Albert Costa (1–1)
 Jim Courier (1–1)
 David Ferrer (1–1)
 John Isner (1–1)
 Goran Ivanišević (1–1)
 Nicolás Lapentti (1–1)
 Magnus Larsson (1–1)
 Mariano Puerta (1–1)
 Janko Tipsarević (1–1)
 Arnaud Clément (1–2)
 Andriy Medvedev (1–2)
 Magnus Norman (1–2)
 Radek Štěpánek (1–2)
 Stan Wawrinka (1–3)
 Jürgen Melzer (1–4)
 Carlos Costa (0–1)
 Juan Martín del Potro (0–1)
 Richard Krajicek (0–1)
 Pat Rafter (0–1)
 Jo-Wilfried Tsonga (0–1)
 Juan Mónaco (0–2)
 Rafael Nadal (0–2)
 Nicolás Almagro (0–3)
 Gaël Monfils (0–4)

Wins per season

Doubles

Wins per season

External links
 
 
 

Safin, Marat